The 1994–95 NBA season was the Mavericks' 15th season in the National Basketball Association. With the hopes of repeating history, the Mavericks brought back original head coach Dick Motta to restore a team that had compiled an awful 24–140 record over the last two years. The Mavericks had the second overall pick in the 1994 NBA draft, and selected Jason Kidd from the University of California. Meanwhile, former Sixth Man Roy Tarpley returned after being suspended by the NBA three years ago.

With the new trio of Kidd, second-year star Jamal Mashburn and Jim Jackson, the Mavericks had a formidable young foundation, winning seven of their first eleven games. However, after a 16–17 start, they would lose eight straight games in January, and hold an 18–28 record at the All-Star break. At midseason, the team signed free agent George McCloud, and acquired Scott Brooks from the Houston Rockets. The Mavericks finished fifth in the Midwest Division with a 36–46 record, which was 23 more wins then their previous season, and 12 more wins then their previous two seasons combined.

Kidd averaged 11.7 points, 5.4 rebounds, 7.7 assists and 1.9 steals per game, as he shared Rookie of the Year honors with Grant Hill of the Detroit Pistons, and was named to the NBA All-Rookie First Team. In addition, Jackson averaged a career-high of 25.7 points per game, but only played 51 games due to an ankle injury, while Mashburn had a stellar sophomore season, finishing second on the team in scoring with 24.1 points per game, and Tarpley provided the team with 12.6 points and 8.2 rebounds per game off the bench, but only played 55 games due to foot and knee injuries. Second-year forward Popeye Jones averaged 10.3 points and led the team with 10.6 rebounds per game, while McCloud contributed 9.6 points per game in 42 games, second-year guard Lucious Harris contributed 9.5 points per game, and defensive center Lorenzo Williams provided with 8.4 rebounds and 1.8 blocks per game. 

Following the season, Doug Smith, who failed to live up to expectations as a top draft pick after four seasons with the Mavericks, left in the 1995 NBA Expansion Draft.

Offseason

Draft picks

Roster

Regular season

Season standings

z - clinched division title
y - clinched division title
x - clinched playoff spot

Record vs. opponents

Game log

|- align="center" bgcolor="#ffcccc"
| 26
| January 3, 19957:30p.m. CST
| Houston
| L 98–110
| Jackson (27)
| Tarpley (12)
| Kidd (11)
| Reunion Arena17,502
| 13–13
|- align="center" bgcolor="#ffcccc"
| 27
| January 5, 19957:30p.m. CST
| @ Houston
| L 99–108
| Jackson (26)
| Tarpley (13)
| Kidd (8)
| The Summit16,611
| 13–14

|- align="center"
|colspan="9" bgcolor="#bbcaff"|All-Star Break
|- style="background:#cfc;"
|- bgcolor="#bbffbb"
|- align="center" bgcolor="#ccffcc"
| 53
| February 28, 19957:30p.m. CST
| Houston
| W 102–101
| Mashburn (22)
| Williams (13)
| Kidd (7)
| Reunion Arena17,502
| 21–32

|- align="center" bgcolor="#ffcccc"
| 58
| March 11, 19957:30p.m. CST
| @ Houston
| L 102–109
| Mashburn (33)
| Jones (14)
| Kidd (7)
| The Summit16,611
| 22–36

|- align="center" bgcolor="#ccffcc"
| 75
| April 11, 19957:30p.m. CDT
| @ Houston
| W 156–147 (2OT)
| Mashburn (42)
| Jones (21)
| Kidd (10)
| The Summit16,431
| 34–41

Player statistics

Awards and records
 Jason Kidd, NBA Rookie of the Year Award
 Jason Kidd, NBA All-Rookie Team 1st Team

Transactions

References

See also
 1994–95 NBA season

Dallas Mavericks seasons
Dallas
Dallas
Dallas